The University of Sfax (Arabic: جامعة صفاقس French: Université de Sfax) is a university located in Sfax, Tunisia. It was founded in 1986 under the name University of the South with the purpose of covering all academic institutions in Southern Tunisia. It is divided into three universities, including the current University of Sfax, with the creation of the University of Gabes in 2003 and the University of Gafsa in 2004.

Organization 
The University of Sfax had 43,473 students in 2008–2009. The students were distributed among 21 higher education institutions, five research faculties, three colleges, twelve institutes, and a research center. They are the:
Faculty of Medicine
Faculty of Economics and Management
Faculty of Law
Faculty of Arts and Humanities
Faculty of Science
National Engineering School
Graduate School of Business
Graduate School of Science and Technology in Health
Higher Institute of Arts and Crafts
Institute of Music
Higher Institute of Computer Science and Multimedia
Higher Institute of Business Administration
Higher Institute of Sport and Physical Education
Preparatory Institute for Engineering Studies
Institute of High Business Studies
Higher Institute of Industrial Management
Higher Institute of Electronics and Communication
Higher Institute of Biotechnology
Higher Institute of Technological Studies
Institute of the Olive Tree
Biotechnology Center

The University of Sfax maintains partnerships with large corporations and academic cooperation in research and exchange programs with foreign universities in several countries like France, Canada, Belgium, Morocco, etc.

Faculty of Medicine of Sfax 

The Faculty of Medicine of Sfax or FMS, is a Tunisian university establishment created according to the law N°74-83 of December 11, 1974.

Flat Earth controversy
In April 2017, it was revealed that an anonymous PhD student at the university had submitted a thesis defending a flat Earth, and that it had passed the initial review stage, although its thesis defense was unsuccessful. It also defended geocentrism and young-Earth creationism, and denied Newtonian mechanics and the Big Bang, largely based upon a literal interpretation of the Quran. The incident sparked discussion of the academic standards in Tunisia and the Arab World. Faouzia Charfi, a professor at the nearby University of Tunis, asked, "How can we accept that the University is not the space of knowledge, of scientific rigor, but that of the negation of science? That where science is refused because it is not in conformity with Islam?"

Belgian astronomer Yaël Nazé also wrote an article on the subject. She commented that even though the thesis was first publicly announced on April 1st, "it was not an April Fool’s joke."

See also 

 List of colleges and universities

References

External links 
University of Sfax Website 

 
Educational institutions established in 1986
1986 establishments in Tunisia